Prosus N.V., or Prosus, is a global investment group that invests and operates across sectors and markets with long-term growth potential. It is among the largest technology investors in the world.

Prosus has invested across multiple verticals, including social / gaming, classifieds, payments and fintech, edtech, food delivery and ecommerce. Products and services of its businesses and investments are used by more than 1.5 billion people in 89 markets.

Prosus is majority-owned by South African multinational Naspers. In September 2019, Prosus's ordinary shares were listed on Euronext Amsterdam and, as a secondary inward-listing, on the Johannesburg Stock Exchange. Subsequent to its , Prosus became the largest consumer Internet company in Europe by asset value. Shares in the company were reported to have "soared on debut," although the company was trading at a significant discount to the value of its portfolio.

Business 

The group's expansion into Internet platforms began in the 1990s, spanning various tech investments, including:
 Social - Tencent (30.86%)
 Classifieds -  OLX (100%), EPMG, OfferUp
 Fintech - PayU (98.8%), Remitly, Red Dot Payment, BUX
 Food - iFood (100%), Delivery Hero (22.3%), Swiggy (38.8%), Oda, Flink, Wolt, Foodics, ShareBite, Facily 
 EdTech - Stack Overflow, Brainly, Udemy, Skillsoft, GoStudent, GoodHabitz, Eruditus, BYJU's, Platzi, EduMe and SoloLearn
 Ecommerce - eMAG (80.1%), Meesho, Mensa Brands, PharmEasy, Ula, ElasticRun, merXu, The Good Glamm Group
 Travel - Ctrip (6%)
 Mobility / Logistics - Bykea, 99minutos, QuickRide, Dott, Shipper
 AgriTech: DeHaat, VeGrow, CaptainFresh
 Other: Airmeet, Wayflyer

Prosus is best known for its investments in Tencent, dating back to a 45% share in 2001. In 2019 the company attempted to acquire Just Eat, but lost the bidding war to Takeaway.com.

In March 2022, Prosus announced it was writing off its 25.9% stake (worth approximately US$700m) in social media company VK, after VK's CEO Vladimir Kirienko was put on a U.S. sanctions list.

Controversy 
Following the 2022 Russian invasion of Ukraine which began on February 24, many international, particularly Western companies pulled out of Russia. Unlike most of its Western competitors, Prosus has been slow to announce any disinvestments or scaling back of its operations in Russia, drawing criticism. The criticism concerned in particular its Avito service (a subsidiary of OLX), which among others publishes advertisements about recruiting to the Russian army.

Acquisitions

References

External links

Companies based in Amsterdam
Companies listed on Euronext Amsterdam
Companies listed on the Johannesburg Stock Exchange
Financial technology companies
2019 initial public offerings
Companies in the Euro Stoxx 50
Tencent